The Shah Cheragh attack was a mass shooting that occurred on 26 October 2022 at Shah Cheragh mosque, a Shia pilgrimage site in Shiraz in southern Iran, in which at least 13 people were killed.

The Islamic State claimed responsibility for the attacks. Iranian authorities condemned the attacks and accused the protestors of Mahsa Amini's death of paving the way for such attacks to occur.

Background
Iran is a Shia Islamic theocracy that has suffered from terrorist attacks by Sunni Islamists and separatists in the past. In April 2022, two Shia clerics were stabbed to death in Mashhad; the perpetrator was allegedly a radical Sunni Uzbek. In 2017, ISIS bombed the mausoleum of Ruhollah Khomeini. In 2008, another bombing in a mosque in Shiraz killed 14.

Attack 
On 26 October 2022, either 13 or 15 people were killed in a mass shooting at Shah Cheragh mausoleum in Shiraz, Fars province, Iran. The Iranian semi-official Tasnim News Agency stated that children were among the dead.

The three attackers are described by Iranian state media as appearing to be takfiri terrorists. Two attackers have been arrested; the other is at large. Later the same day, Islamic State reportedly claimed responsibility for the attack. The Iranian authorities stated that the attackers were not Iranian nationals.

Conflicting reports from the local judiciary chief suggest that only one terrorist was involved.

Casualties 

Sources report either thirteen or fifteen people as being killed as a result of the mass shooting, including children.

Perpetrator 
The Islamic State claimed responsibility for the attack via Amaq, the group's propaganda media. A report by The Washington Institute for Near East Policy said ISIS had uploaded a video of the perpetrator declaring allegiance to the Islamic State. According to Voice of America Persian News Network, some Iranian protestors speculated that this terrorist attack was a conspiracy of the Iranian government to divert public opinion from Iran's nationwide protests. However, Mohammad Gharawi, director of the New Generation Media Center said that ISIS "is now taking revenge for the fact that Iran contributed to its elimination in Iraq and Syria".

Associate professor Fouad Izadi, member of the Faculty of World Studies of the University of Tehran, said the attack was "an ISIS trademark" as the group was known for attacking mosques and shrines in the past. On the other hand, the Institute for the Study of War assessed that the attack does not match the typical ISIS pattern and views it as an attempt to stoke sectarian tensions in Iran. Regardless of who is behind the attack, it expects the Iranian government to exploit it to weaken and/or suppress the ongoing Mahsa Amini protests.

Reactions

Domestic 

Iranian Supreme Leader, Ali Khamenei called on Iranians to unite and vowed to punish the perpetrators of the attack. Interior Minister Ahmad Vahidi blamed the Mahsa Amini protests for paving the ground for the attack on the mausoleum but this has not been fully confirmed. Officials in the Fars province, where the attack took place, declared three days of mourning. Iran's President, Ebrahim Raisi said "Experience shows that Iran's enemies, after failing to create a split in the nation's united ranks, take revenge through violence and terror."

Iranian authorities organized rallies in Shiraz and elsewhere in the country to denounce the shooting. According to state-affiliated media "large numbers of students and professors" reportedly took part in demonstrations denouncing the Shiraz terrorist attack.

International 
The United Nations Secretary-General António Guterres strongly condemned the terrorist assault on the Shah Cheragh Holy Shrine in Shiraz, Iran, which is claimed by the Islamic State. The message said that targeting religious places is heinous and the Secretary-General emphasized: "bring[ing] to justice the perpetrators of this crime against civilians exercising their right to practice their religion". Also, the Secretary-General expressed his condolences to the bereaved families, the Iranian people, and the Iranian government wished a swift recovery for the injured.

Oman offered condolences to the government and people of Iran. Pakistan condemned the attack and expressed solidarity with the Iranian people. Lebanon called for the punishment of those responsible even if those responsible are their own citizens. Turkey denounced the "heinous and cruel terrorist attack." Finland said that it was "Deeply saddened by the terrorist attack at the Shah Cheragh shrine in Shiraz" and it "strongly condemns terrorism in all its forms and manifestations". India strongly condemned the attack and extended condolences to Iran and urged the world "unite and combat terrorism in all its forms and manifestations".

See also 
Assassination and terrorism in Iran
Iran and the Islamic State
List of terrorist incidents linked to the Islamic State
Shiraz bombing

References

External links
 

2022 mass shootings in Asia
21st-century mass murder in Asia
Attacks in Iran in 2022
Attacks on buildings and structures in 2022
Attacks on religious buildings and structures in Asia
Attacks on Shiite mosques
History of Fars Province
Islamic State of Iraq and the Levant and Iran
Islamist attacks on mosques
Mahsa Amini protests
Mass murder in 2022
Mass shootings in Iran
October 2022 crimes in Asia
October 2022 events in Iran
Shia–Sunni sectarian violence
2022 massacre
Terrorist incidents in Iran in 2022
Violence against Shia Muslims in Iran